Antispila hydrangifoliella is a moth of the family Heliozelidae. It was described by Kuroko in 1961. It is found in Japan (Kyushu).

The wingspan is 5–6 mm. The forewings are dark bronzy-fuscous with feeble reflections. The basal area is shining leaden-bronze and the markings are silvery-white, with feeble metallic reflections. The hindwings are pale fuscous, with feeble purplish lusters. Adults appear from the end July to the beginning of August. There is one generation per year.

The larvae feed on Hydrangea macrophylla and Hydrangea petiolaris. They mine the leaves of their host plant. The mine has the form of a full depth linear-blotch. The linear mine is pale yellowish green to pale brown and semitransparent. It proceeds as an irregular wavy gallery, somewhat confined by the ribs of the leaves. After the third moult of the larva, the mine expands into an irregular, semitransparent, whitish green blotch, often along the leaf margin. Usually, one mine is found in a single leaf, although sometimes two mines are made. The frass is blackish and is deposited in a row occupying the whole width of the gallery in the linear part of the mine. In the blotch mine, it is thinly scattered and sometimes deposited along the margin of the mine. Larvae are found from mid to the end of October. Full-grown larvae cut out a case in which they hibernate. Pupation occurs in mid July.

References

Moths described in 1961
Heliozelidae
Moths of Japan